Old Stone Fort was a fort that existed in 1814 in Rockport, Massachusetts during the War of 1812. It was also known as Sea Fensibles Barrack during its existence. Today, a plaque is located on the Transit Tower, which was built on the site of the fort. Stones from the former fort were used in the construction of the harbor's breakwater.

See also
 List of military installations in Massachusetts

References

Forts in Massachusetts
War of 1812 forts
Rockport, Massachusetts